Douglas Baker (August 27, 1921 – December 14, 1944) was a United States Navy fighter pilot and flying ace during World War II. Baker was a F6F Hellcat pilot and triple ace with 16.3 aerial victories.

See also
USS Enterprise (CV-6)

References

External links

1921 births
1944 deaths
American World War II flying aces
Recipients of the Silver Star
Recipients of the Distinguished Flying Cross (United States)
Recipients of the Navy Cross (United States)
United States Navy officers
United States Navy pilots of World War II
United States Navy personnel killed in World War II
Aviators killed by being shot down
Aviators killed in aviation accidents or incidents